Ljubomir "Ljubo" Kojo (Serbian Cyrillic: Љубомир Којо; 3 August 1920 – 19 April 1993) was a Bosnian and Yugoslav politician who served as the 19th Mayor of Sarajevo from 1955 to 1962.

Early life
He was born into a prominent Serb family on 3 August 1920 in Sarajevo, Bosnia and Herzegovina, which was then a part of the Kingdom of Yugoslavia. He received his high school education in the Sarayevan academy of commerce. With the Axis invasion of Yugoslavia and the formation of the NDH puppet state in 1941, he joined the Yugoslav Partisans. After being gravely wounded in battle, he was transferred to a military hospital in Bari, Italy where he recovered on the eve of the liberation of Sarajevo.

Political career
After returning to the city he was named Administrator of the People's goods, an institution set-up after the war to ration food and basic utilities.   He further held the positions of alderman, Sarajevo city committee vice-chairman and the Mayor of Sarajevo from 1955 to 1962. Between 1962 and 1966 he was a minister in the government of SR Bosnia and Herzegovina. In 1969 he was named representative of the Bosnian Chamber of Commerce in Moscow, a position he held for two years. He was one of the founders of prominent Yugoslav First League football club, FK Sarajevo and held the position of the club's 10th president of the assembly from 1962 to 1963. He spent his latter years as director of the Skenderija center.

Death
Kojo died on 19 April 1993 in Belgrade, Serbia, FR Yugoslavia.

References

1920 births
1993 deaths
Mayors of Sarajevo
FK Sarajevo presidents of the assembly
Serbs of Bosnia and Herzegovina
Yugoslav politicians
University of Sarajevo alumni
Businesspeople from Sarajevo